Runciman railway station was a station on the North Island Main Trunk line in New Zealand, serving an area which had been sold by James Runciman in 1864, with plots near the proposed railway gaining higher prices.

The Auckland and Drury Railway Act 1863 had been passed by Parliament "to enable the Superintendent of the Province of Auckland to construct a Railway between the Towns of Auckland and Drury with a Branch to Onehunga in the said Province." The Auckland and Drury Railway formed the first section from Auckland of what later became the North Island Main Trunk line to Wellington.

It was initially planned that the terminal of the Auckland and Drury Railway would be north-east of the settlement, but a longstanding offer of Runciman's land was still open in 1864 and it was built there instead.

There was debate about the location of the station as early as 1874. Although the line was complete by late 1873, the first passenger train didn't run until 7 October 1874 and complaint continued about delays in opening the line. Possibly the delay was due to threats to blockade the line to force trains to stop at Runciman. Drury became a crossing point for trains on the official opening to Mercer on 20 May 1875. It seems Drury station was known as Runciman, though the name didn't become official until July 1879. The disputes over location seem to have continued throughout the station's existence. By 1895 it had cattle loading facilities. The name was briefly changed to Oira in 1909.

Until 1917 Runciman station was next to a level crossing on the Great South Rd. Work then began to replace the crossing with a bridge, ease the gradient and build a new Drury station between Runciman and Drury, despite a protest petition about the move a few chains away.

References 

Defunct railway stations in New Zealand
Buildings and structures in the Auckland Region
Rail transport in the Auckland Region
Railway stations opened in 1879
Railway stations closed in 1918